Viktor Šiljeg (born 2 May 1992) is a Croatian football defender, who currently plays for German amateur side SpVg Hagen 11.

Club career
He has played for Triglav Kranj in the Slovenian Second League and for several German lower league sides.

Personal life
He holds Slovene, Croatian and Bosnian citizenship.

References

External links
PrvaLiga profile 

1992 births
Living people
Footballers from Ljubljana
Association football defenders
Slovenian footballers
HŠK Zrinjski Mostar players
HNK Zmaj Makarska players
HNK Čapljina players
NK Triglav Kranj players
NK Jedinstvo Bihać players
Premier League of Bosnia and Herzegovina players
First League of the Federation of Bosnia and Herzegovina players
Slovenian Second League players
Landesliga players
Slovenian expatriate footballers
Expatriate footballers in Germany
Slovenian expatriate sportspeople in Germany